The 1970 NCAA University Division Tennis Championships were the 25th annual tournaments to determine the national champions of NCAA University Division men's singles, doubles, and team collegiate tennis in the United States.

UCLA captured the team championship, the Bruins' ninth such title. UCLA finished four points ahead of Rice and Trinity (TX) in the final team standings (26–22–22).

Host site
This year's tournaments were contested at the Eccles Tennis Center at the University of Utah in Salt Lake City, Utah.

Team scoring
Until 1977, the men's team championship was determined by points awarded based on individual performances in the singles and doubles events.

References

External links
List of NCAA Men's Tennis Champions

NCAA Division I tennis championships
NCAA Division I Tennis Championships
NCAA Division I Tennis Championships
NCAA University Division Tennis Championships